Ruslan Volodymyrovych Baginskiy, is a Ukrainian headwear and accessory designer, a founder of the eponymous Ruslan Baginskiy brand. Ruslan is currently based in Kyiv, Ukraine.

Early life and career 

Ruslan was born on September 5, 1989, in Lviv, Ukraine. He studied at the Faculty of Geography of the Ivan Franko National University of Lviv. At the age of 20 Baginskiy started to work as a stylist for shoots and shows of Ukrainian designers. In 2011, Ruslan made his first head piece for the fashion shoot. He soon became fascinated with the world of headwear, learning from the experience of local milliners and interning at a Lviv atelier.

Ruslan Baginskiy brand 

In 2015, Ruslan Baginskiy started his own headwear and accessory brand. The first collection was inspired by head pieces of the XX century, reimagined in a modern way.  In 2017, Ruslan moved from Lviv to Kyiv and opened his first showroom. Later on, Ruslan’s mother, father and brother also moved to Kyiv, becoming the part of the RB team. Ruslan Baginskiy creates one couture collection and four seasonal collections per year. The brand is available on Browns, Matchesfashion, Mytheresa, Luisaviaroma, Moda Operandi and Revolve, in Harrods, Holt Renfrew, Dover Street Market, Harvey Nichols and Lane Crawford. The complete list of stockists and online-retailers can be found on the brand’s website.

2016 — First articles about the brand appeared in Harper’s Bazaar UA, Elle UA, L’Officiel Homme UA and Harper’s Bazaar Russia. The baker boy cap was presented, which is now a signature piece, worn by Bella and Gigi Hadid, Kaia Gerber, Rosie Huntington-Whiteley, Chiara Ferragni and other celebrities.

2017 — First presentation at Ukrainian Fashion Week.

2018 — Ruslan Baginskiy created a personalized hat for Madonna specially for the Vogue Italia August issue cover story From then on, Madonna supports the brand and is the muse of the designer. In the same year, Ruslan Baginskiy presented a collaboration with the American brand RTA.

2019 — Ruslan Baginskiy created an exclusive product for the largest Italian retailer Luisaviaroma. On 1 July, the brand presented the first couture collection “Stozhary” (Ukrainian:Стожари). The presentation at Hôtel de Crillon in Paris was attended by Nicky Hilton Rothschild, Sofia Sanchez de Betak and Karla Otto. The presentation setup was completed with the sculptures of Ukrainian artist Maria Kulikovska and the invitation was created by Nikolay Tolmachev.

2020 — The New York Times published an article about Ruslan Baginskiy. Ukraine's first lady Olena Zelenska attended an audience with Pope Francis, wearing a Ruslan Baginskiy piece. Rosé and Lisa from K-pop group Blackpink wore Ruslan Baginskiy accessories in the music video for “Ice Cream”, featuring Selena Gomez. The brand presented its second couture collection named “TSVIT”. Due to the pandemics, the presentation was carried out online, through the medium of the art project in collaboration with Ukrainian duo of photographers Synchrodogs and stylist Julie Pelipas. The Instagram mask with a couture headpiece was tried on by Tina Kunakey, Irina Shayk and Sasha Luss.

2021 — V from the South Korean group BTS wore the RB Straw Boater Hat for the “Butter” video. The brand releases a photo project with a Los Angeles-based photographer Henrik Purienne. In July, the first Ruslan Baginskiy pop-up store was opened in the Parisian indie store Paradise Garage Store.

References 

1989 births
Living people
Artists from Lviv
University of Lviv alumni